Žiželice is a municipality and village in Louny District in the Ústí nad Labem Region of the Czech Republic. It has about 400 inhabitants.

Administrative parts
Villages of Hořetice, Přívlaky and Stroupeč are administrative parts of Žiželice.

Notable people
Joseph Karl Bernard (1780–1850), Austrian journalist and librettist

References

Villages in Louny District